Alfredo de Boer (born 16 May 1907, date of death unknown) was a Brazilian rower. He competed in the men's eight event at the 1936 Summer Olympics.

References

External links
 
 

1907 births
Year of death missing
Brazilian male rowers
Olympic rowers of Brazil
Rowers at the 1936 Summer Olympics
People from Rio Grande (Rio Grande do Sul)
Sportspeople from Rio Grande do Sul